Riverview Farm Park is a municipal park located in Newport News, Virginia. It is run by the Newport News Department of Parks, Recreation and Tourism.

Location 
Riverview Farm Park is located on 279 acres (1.1 km2) in the Menchville section of Newport News, at the intersection of Menchville and Youngs Roads. The Riverview Farm Park Visitor Center sits at the end of City Farm Road.

Offerings

Playground and family-use structures 
Riverview Farm Park is home to a 30,000 square foot (3,000 m2) community playground called Fantasy Farm. The park also has several picnic areas, along with some shelters.

Athletics 
There is a general-use soccer field at the park site. The field is adjacent to the playground. Restrooms are provided in the area of the field.

Trails 
Two miles of paved, multi-use trails surround the playground and soccer field area. There is also a trail that runs from the Riverview Farm Park Visitor Center to the bank of the Warwick River.

External links
Official site

Virginia municipal and county parks
Parks in Newport News, Virginia